The Thames Valley District School Board (TVDSB; known as English-language Public District School Board No. 11 prior to 1999) is a public school board in southwestern Ontario, Canada. It was created on January 1, 1998, by the amalgamation of the Elgin County Board of Education, The Board of Education for the City of London, Middlesex County Board of Education, and Oxford County Board of Education.

The TVDSB serves an area over 7,000 square kilometres which includes urban, suburban and rural communities.  It spans three counties and includes the cities of London, St. Thomas, and Woodstock, plus the towns of Ingersoll, Tillsonburg, and Strathroy-Caradoc, as well as several smaller towns and villages.

In 2006, the Board administered 184 schools (154 elementary and 30 secondary schools).  They also provide alternative education programs for approximately 40,000 students through adult day school, continuing education, general interest, night school and summer school courses. Four future elementary schools in southwest London, northwest London, Woodstock, and Belmont are currently under construction or are in planning stages. Extensions and renovations to Eagle Heights, Aldborough, and River Heights public schools are currently underway.

History
The Thames Valley District School Board was the setting of R v. Jarvis, 2019 SCC 10 a precedent-setting case of voyeurism in Canada. In 2021, the Thames Valley District School Board was named as a defendant in a civil lawsuit related to the sexually inappropriate behaviour of one of its teachers, Ryan Jarvis.  Jarvis filmed at least 27 teenage students with a spy camera while he  was an English teacher at H.B. Beal Secondary School.  He used a camera concealed in a pen to film his female students' breasts.  Jarvis became the first person in Canada to serve jail time for a voyeurism conviction. Jarvis' teaching license was revoked following his conviction.

In 2021, Lawrence Thompson, a custodian at a TVDSB elementary school, was found guilty of four counts of kidnapping and sexual assault of a four-year-old girl. During the investigation in 2018, the school board indicated it would fully cooperate with police and local law enforcement authorities. However, the TVDSB declined to provide a list of schools that the janitor previously worked at.

List of schools
The following is a list of the schools administered by the TVDSB and their towns/city:

Public schools

Secondary schools
A.B. Lucas Secondary School – London
Arthur Voaden Secondary School – St. Thomas
B. Davison Secondary School – London
Central Elgin Collegiate Institute – St. Thomas
London Central Secondary School – London
Clarke Road Secondary School – London
College Avenue Secondary School – Woodstock
East Elgin Secondary School – Aylmer
Glencoe District High School – Glencoe
Glendale High School – Tillsonburg
H.B. Beal Secondary School – London
Huron Park Secondary School – Woodstock
Ingersoll District Collegiate Institute – Ingersoll
London South Collegiate Institute – London
Lord Dorchester Secondary School – Dorchester
Medway High School – Arva
Montcalm Secondary School – London
North Middlesex District High School – Parkhill
Oakridge Secondary School – London
Parkside Collegiate Institute (incl. French Immersion) – St. Thomas
Saunders Secondary School – London
Sir Frederick Banting Secondary School (incl. French Immersion) – London
Sir Wilfrid Laurier Secondary School  (incl. French Immersion) – London
Strathroy District Collegiate Institute (incl. French Immersion) – Strathroy-Caradoc
Thames Valley Alternative Secondary School (teachers located throughout the entire Board district)
West Elgin Secondary School – West Lorne
Westminster Secondary School - London
Woodstock Collegiate Institute (incl. French Immersion) – Woodstock

See also
Conseil scolaire catholique Providence – French Catholic School Board
Conseil scolaire Viamonde – French Public School Board
List of English public schools in London Ontario
List of high schools in Ontario
List of school districts in Ontario
London District Catholic School Board – English Catholic School Board

References

School districts in Ontario
Education in Middlesex County, Ontario
Education in London, Ontario
Education in Oxford County, Ontario
Education in Elgin County